Sir George Grey (1812–1898) was the British Governor of Cape Colony, South Australia and New Zealand.

George Grey may also refer to:

 George Grey, 2nd Earl of Kent (1454–1505), English nobleman and soldier
 George Grey, 5th Earl of Stamford (1737–1818), British peer
 George Grey, 6th Earl of Stamford (1765–1845), British peer and politician, son of the above
 Sir George Grey, 1st Baronet (1767–1828), British Royal Navy officer
 Sir George Grey, 2nd Baronet (1799–1882), British politician, son of the above
 George Grey, 8th Baron Grey of Groby (1802–1835), British peer, son of the 6th Earl of Stamford
 George Grey, 7th Earl of Stamford (1827–1883), British peer, son of the above
 George Charles Grey (1918–1944), British politician, Member of Parliament for Berwick-upon-Tweed 
 George Grey (skier) (born 1979), Canadian cross-country skier

See also 
 George Gray (disambiguation)